Ngama is a city in Chad, located in the region of Hadjer-Lamis.

Hadjer-Lamis Region
Populated places in Chad